Gustav Gross (born 19 January 1926) was an Austrian ice hockey player. He competed in the men's tournament at the 1948 Winter Olympics. At the 1948 Olympics he played under his birth name August Specht. He later changed his last name to Gross.

References

External links
 

1926 births
Possibly living people
Ice hockey people from Vienna
Ice hockey players at the 1948 Winter Olympics
Olympic ice hockey players of Austria